Pandwala Kalan, officially the Pandwala Kalan (Pandwala Kalan) is a village in South West Delhi. It is the one of the largest village by area, the tenth most popular village (with over 3,779 people) in the Najafgarh Tehsil of South-West Delhi. It is bounded by the Daulatpur, Hasan Pur villages on the south, the Ujawa on the southwest, and the Pandwala Khurd on the southeast. It shares land borders with Shri Hans Nagar and Khera Dabar to the west; Paprawat to the northeast.

Etymology The name Pandwala Kalan is derived from Paṇḍ (पण्ड्), which means "to collect, heap, pile up", and this root is used in the sense of knowledge.[5] The term is found in Vedic and post-Vedic texts, but without any sociological context. In the colonial era literature, the term generally refers to Brahmins specialized in Hindu law.[6] Aala (आला), which means the supreme leader of the organization.

The latter term stems from the Kalan (Hindustani: कलाँ, Punjabi: ਕਲਾਂ) are administrative designations used in India and Pakistan to indicate the smaller (Khurd) and larger (Kalan) segments of a town, village or settlement.

The geographical term Pandwala Kalan, which is recognized by the Constitution of India as an official name for the village is used by many in its variations. Scholars believe it to be named after the Vedic tribe in the second millennium B.C.E. It is also traditionally associated with the Droņa (Sanskrit: द्रोण, Droņa) or Droņacharya or Guru Droņa, the royal preceptor to the Kauravas and Pandavas and incarnation of Brahma; an avatar of Brihaspati. He was the son of rishi Bharadwaja and a descendant of the sage Angirasa. He was a master of advanced military arts, including the divine weapons or Astras.

History

Ancient Pandwala has an ancient history since Mahabharata era when Drona decides to continue Parashurama's legacy by starting his own school. He uproots his family and begins wandering Northern India. While at Hastinapur, he comes across the Kuru princes at play, and is able to use his abilities to help the princes solve some of their problems. Amazed, the princes go to their patriarch Bhisma with news of this magician. Bhishma instantly realized that this was Drona, and asked him to become the Guru of the Kuru princes, training them in advanced military arts.[6] It is believed that the city of Gurgaon (literally - "Village of the Guru") was founded as "Guru Gram" by Dronacharya on land given to him by Dhritarashtra, the king of Hastinapura in recognition of his teachings of martial arts to the princes, and the 'Dronacharya Tank', still exists within the Gurgaon city, along with a village called Gurgaon.[14] Indian Government (Haryana), on 12 April, decided to reinstate and change the name of Gurgaon to 'Gurugram'. Pandwala as one of the place part of Gurgaon where teaching of Dharma was taught to the Kauravas and Pandavas.

See also
 Najafgarh

References

Villages in South West Delhi district